Moremoholo is a community council located in the Mokhotlong District of Lesotho. Its population in 2006 was 9,694.

Villages
The community of Moremoholo includes the villages of Boiketlo, Botaisa, Foreistata, Ha Chopho (Bafali), Ha Hlakane, Ha Leapola, Ha Lebopo, Ha Lisene, Ha Makoae, Ha Molao, Ha Motanyane, Ha Poso, Ha Soai, Ha Tolotsana, Ha Tšekelo, Khohlong, Khohlong (Ha Senkoase), Letlapeng, Mahoeng (Ha Senkoase), Mahooeng, Makhapung, Makoatleng, Makoetjaneng, Mangaung, Mangopeng, Maphohong, Masaleng, Masuoaneng, Matebeleng, Matobo, Matsatsaneng, Moshemong, Mothontsene, Nkotoane, Ntsiking, Ntširele, Paneng, Senkoase, Sepanyeng (Ha Senkoase), Thaba-Khubelu, Thaba-Ntšo, Thoteng (Ha Senkoase), Tiping and Tlokoeng (Bafali).

References

External links
 Google map of community villages

Populated places in Mokhotlong District